Alleghany County or Allegany County may refer to:
Alleghany County, North Carolina, county seat Sparta
Alleghany County, Virginia, in the Roanoke Region
Allegany County, Maryland, county seat Cumberland
Allegany County, New York, county seat Belmont

See also
Allegheny County, Pennsylvania, home to Pittsburgh